The 2012 Waikato Bay of Plenty Magic season saw Waikato Bay of Plenty Magic compete in the 2012 ANZ Championship. With a team coached by Noeline Taurua, captained by Laura Langman and featuring Leana de Bruin, Irene van Dyk, Julianna Naoupu and Casey Williams, Magic eventually won the premiership. They became the fifth team in as many seasons to win the title. Magic lost their first four matches. However, they subsequently won 12 matches in a row to finish third during the regular season and champions overall. In the minor semi-final they defeated Adelaide Thunderbirds and in the preliminary final they defeated Northern Mystics after extra time. In the grand final they defeated Melbourne Vixens 41–38. As a result, they became the first, and only, New Zealand team to win the Championship. They were also the first and only team to start the season with four defeats and win the title and the first and only team to finish third in the regular season and win the title.

Players

Player movements

Squad

Tauranga Pre-Season Tournament
On 2, 3 and 4 March, Waikato Bay of Plenty Magic hosted a pre-season tournament at the TECT Arena in Tauranga. For the first time since 2008, all ten ANZ Championship teams competed at the same tournament. Magic finished the tournament in third place. The tournament was won by Queensland Firebirds who defeated Melbourne Vixens 50–30 in the final.

3rd/4th place play-off

Regular season

Fixtures and results
Round 1

Round 2

Round 3

Round 4

Round 5

Round 6

Round 7

Round 8

Round 9
Waikato Bay of Plenty Magic received a bye.
Round 10

Round 11

Round 12

Round 13

Round 14

Final table

Finals

Minor semi-final

Preliminary final

Grand final

Award winners

ANZ Championship awards

Notes
  Laura Langman shared the MVP Award with Temepara George

All Stars

References

2012
2012 ANZ Championship season
2012 in New Zealand netball